George Whitfield Jack, Jr., known as Whitfield Jack  or Whit Jack (July 10, 1906 – April 23, 1989), was a United States Army colonel in World War II, a major general of the United States Army Reserve, and a Shreveport, Louisiana attorney. 
 
Jack was the son of judge George W. Jack and brother of Louisiana politician Wellborn Jack.

References

1906 births
1989 deaths
People from Shreveport, Louisiana
Louisiana lawyers
Louisiana Democrats
Centenary College of Louisiana alumni
United States Military Academy alumni
Yale Law School alumni
Tulane University Law School alumni
United States Army officers
United States Army personnel of World War II
Recipients of the Legion of Merit
Recipients of the Croix de Guerre 1939–1945 (France)
American Episcopalians
Burials in Louisiana